Chavarzaq Rural District is in Chavarzaq District of Tarom County, Zanjan province, Iran. At the National Census of 2006, its population was 9,616 in 2,283 households. There were 9,858 inhabitants in 2,742 households at the following census of 2011. At the most recent census of 2016, the population of the rural district was 9,624 in 2,907 households. The largest of its 30 villages was Shit, with 896 people.

References 

Tarom County

Rural Districts of Zanjan Province

Populated places in Zanjan Province

Populated places in Tarom County